Pankaj Saran (born 22 November 1958) is a former Indian civil servant of the Indian Foreign Service cadre. He was the Deputy National Security Adviser of India.

Personal life
Saran holds a B.A. (Honours) degree and Master of Arts degree in economics from the Hindu College and Delhi School of Economics respectively. His interests include tennis, golf, bridge and reading. He is married to Preeti Saran, who also belongs to the Indian Foreign Service. They have two sons.

Career history
Pankaj Saran joined the Indian Foreign Service in August 1982. He has served at Indian missions in Moscow, Washington, D.C., Cairo and Dhaka. He was the Joint Secretary in the Prime Minister's Office, New Delhi from 2007 to 2012.

Saran was the Indian High Commissioner to Bangladesh in 2015 when the historic India-Bangladesh Land Boundary Agreement was ratified by the Parliament of India.

On 29 May 2018, Pankaj Saran was appointed by the Appointments Committee of the Cabinet as the Deputy National Security Advisor of India.

References
 

Living people
Ambassadors of India to Russia
Delhi School of Economics alumni
1958 births
High Commissioners of India to Bangladesh